The Fair Co-Ed, also known as The Varsity Girl, is a 1927 American silent film comedy starring Marion Davies and released through MGM. The film was produced by William Randolph Hearst, through Cosmopolitan Productions and directed by Sam Wood.

The film is based on a 1909 play/musical comedy The Fair Co-Ed by George Ade which starred a young Elsie Janis, and opened on Broadway on February 1, 1909.

The film survives today, supposedly in the MGM/UA archives, now controlled by Warner Brothers.

Plot
Marion Bright enrolls in college to pursue a handsome young man, Bob, only to discover that he is coach of the women's basketball team there. Marion joins the team and becomes its star player, but becomes unpopular when she refuses to play a game after a disagreement with Bob. Happily for all, she has a change of heart and returns in time to help the team win the big game.

Cast
Marion Davies as Marion Bright
Johnny Mack Brown as Bob
Jane Winton as Betty
Thelma Hill as Rose
Lillian Leighton as Housekeeper
Gene Stone as Herbert
James Bradbury, Sr. as uncredited
Lou Costello as Extra
Joel McCrea as Student
Jacques Tourneur as Extra
Lillian Copeland as basketball player

Production
In her 25th film, Marion Davies starred as a madcap college student with a yen for the basketball coach Johnny Mack Brown. William Randolph Hearst always disliked this film and disliked director Sam Wood. Hearst always referred to this film as "that cheap-looking comedy" that went for "yap laughs." But laughs there were as Davies joins the college basketball team to be near Brown and to spite her rival (Jane Winton). Davies races back and forth on basketball courts, zooms about in jalopies, and even climbs a tree in this one. One of the highlights in the shooting of this film was when Charles Lindbergh visited the set. Davies was his favorite movie star. This was another box-office hit for Davies.

References

External links

Film poster
Period newspaper advertising
Lantern slide; coming attraction 

1927 films
1927 comedy films
American basketball films
American black-and-white films
Silent American comedy films
American films based on plays
American silent feature films
Films directed by Sam Wood
Films set in universities and colleges
Metro-Goldwyn-Mayer films
1920s American films